The 1930 VFL season was the 34th season of the Victorian Football League (VFL), the highest level senior Australian rules football competition in Victoria. The season featured twelve clubs, ran from 3 May until 11 October, and comprised an 18-game home-and-away season followed by a finals series featuring the top four clubs.

The premiership was won by the Collingwood Football Club for the ninth time and fourth time consecutively, after it defeated  by 30 points in the 1930 VFL Grand Final. It is the only time in the league's history that a club has won four consecutive premierships.

Premiership season
In 1930, the VFL competition consisted of twelve teams of 18 on-the-field players each, plus one substitute player, known as the 19th man. A player could be substituted for any reason, Once he had been substituted, a player could not return to the field of play under any circumstances.

Teams played each other in a home-and-away season of 18 rounds; matches 12 to 18 were the "home-and-way reverse" of matches 5 to 11 (i.e., the last seven matches of the round).

Once the 18 round home-and-away season had finished, the 1930 VFL Premiers were determined by the specific format and conventions of the amended "Argus system".

Round 1

|- bgcolor="#CCCCFF"
| Home team
| Home team score
| Away team
| Away team score
| Venue
| Crowd
| Date
|- bgcolor="#FFFFFF"
| 
| 16.7 (103)
| 
| 14.8 (92)
| Glenferrie Oval
| 18,000
| 3 May 1930
|- bgcolor="#FFFFFF"
| 
| 18.13 (121)
| 
| 2.7 (19)
| Corio Oval
| 9,500
| 3 May 1930
|- bgcolor="#FFFFFF"
| 
| 12.14 (86)
| 
| 11.6 (72)
| Brunswick Street Oval
| 18,500
| 3 May 1930
|- bgcolor="#FFFFFF"
| 
| 9.16 (70)
| 
| 13.17 (95)
| Lake Oval
| 16,000
| 3 May 1930
|- bgcolor="#FFFFFF"
| 
| 7.18 (60)
| 
| 10.14 (74)
| Punt Road Oval
| 32,000
| 3 May 1930
|- bgcolor="#FFFFFF"
| 
| 7.9 (51)
| 
| 8.10 (58)
| Windy Hill
| 26,000
| 3 May 1930

Round 2

|- bgcolor="#CCCCFF"
| Home team
| Home team score
| Away team
| Away team score
| Venue
| Crowd
| Date
|- bgcolor="#FFFFFF"
| 
| 16.10 (106)
| 
| 11.12 (78)
| Junction Oval
| 21,500
| 10 May 1930
|- bgcolor="#FFFFFF"
| 
| 11.12 (78)
| 
| 10.10 (70)
| Victoria Park
| 19,000
| 10 May 1930
|- bgcolor="#FFFFFF"
| 
| 17.14 (116)
| 
| 7.5 (47)
| Princes Park
| 35,000
| 10 May 1930
|- bgcolor="#FFFFFF"
| 
| 14.16 (100)
| 
| 8.15 (63)
| MCG
| 14,909
| 10 May 1930
|- bgcolor="#FFFFFF"
| 
| 6.9 (45)
| 
| 9.11 (65)
| Arden Street Oval
| 9,000
| 10 May 1930
|- bgcolor="#FFFFFF"
| 
| 10.14 (74)
| 
| 9.4 (58)
| Western Oval
| 18,000
| 10 May 1930

Round 3

|- bgcolor="#CCCCFF"
| Home team
| Home team score
| Away team
| Away team score
| Venue
| Crowd
| Date
|- bgcolor="#FFFFFF"
| 
| 10.10 (70)
| 
| 9.6 (60)
| Corio Oval
| 13,000
| 17 May 1930
|- bgcolor="#FFFFFF"
| 
| 15.9 (99)
| 
| 15.14 (104)
| Brunswick Street Oval
| 20,000
| 17 May 1930
|- bgcolor="#FFFFFF"
| 
| 11.8 (74)
| 
| 16.20 (116)
| Arden Street Oval
| 13,000
| 17 May 1930
|- bgcolor="#FFFFFF"
| 
| 10.17 (77)
| 
| 12.7 (79)
| Punt Road Oval
| 16,000
| 17 May 1930
|- bgcolor="#FFFFFF"
| 
| 12.12 (84)
| 
| 16.19 (115)
| Lake Oval
| 18,000
| 17 May 1930
|- bgcolor="#FFFFFF"
| 
| 10.12 (72)
| 
| 13.9 (87)
| Glenferrie Oval
| 28,000
| 17 May 1930

Round 4

|- bgcolor="#CCCCFF"
| Home team
| Home team score
| Away team
| Away team score
| Venue
| Crowd
| Date
|- bgcolor="#FFFFFF"
| 
| 18.15 (123)
| 
| 15.12 (102)
| MCG
| 8,662
| 24 May 1930
|- bgcolor="#FFFFFF"
| 
| 9.10 (64)
| 
| 14.7 (91)
| Western Oval
| 20,000
| 24 May 1930
|- bgcolor="#FFFFFF"
| 
| 14.12 (96)
| 
| 8.13 (61)
| Windy Hill
| 15,000
| 24 May 1930
|- bgcolor="#FFFFFF"
| 
| 10.12 (72)
| 
| 12.18 (90)
| Victoria Park
| 17,000
| 24 May 1930
|- bgcolor="#FFFFFF"
| 
| 20.18 (138)
| 
| 11.18 (84)
| Princes Park
| 21,000
| 24 May 1930
|- bgcolor="#FFFFFF"
| 
| 15.18 (108)
| 
| 8.10 (58)
| Junction Oval
| 26,000
| 24 May 1930

Round 5

|- bgcolor="#CCCCFF"
| Home team
| Home team score
| Away team
| Away team score
| Venue
| Crowd
| Date
|- bgcolor="#FFFFFF"
| 
| 14.15 (99)
| 
| 10.11 (71)
| Arden Street Oval
| 12,000
| 31 May 1930
|- bgcolor="#FFFFFF"
| 
| 8.11 (59)
| 
| 11.11 (77)
| Glenferrie Oval
| 18,000
| 31 May 1930
|- bgcolor="#FFFFFF"
| 
| 17.18 (120)
| 
| 9.8 (62)
| MCG
| 16,975
| 31 May 1930
|- bgcolor="#FFFFFF"
| 
| 6.15 (51)
| 
| 15.14 (104)
| Lake Oval
| 18,000
| 31 May 1930
|- bgcolor="#FFFFFF"
| 
| 10.11 (71)
| 
| 9.12 (66)
| Brunswick Street Oval
| 21,000
| 31 May 1930
|- bgcolor="#FFFFFF"
| 
| 8.10 (58)
| 
| 10.6 (66)
| Corio Oval
| 15,500
| 31 May 1930

Round 6

|- bgcolor="#CCCCFF"
| Home team
| Home team score
| Away team
| Away team score
| Venue
| Crowd
| Date
|- bgcolor="#FFFFFF"
| 
| 8.9 (57)
| 
| 8.8 (56)
| Western Oval
| 9,000
| 7 June 1930
|- bgcolor="#FFFFFF"
| 
| 15.24 (114)
| 
| 8.9 (57)
| Victoria Park
| 10,000
| 7 June 1930
|- bgcolor="#FFFFFF"
| 
| 17.16 (118)
| 
| 6.12 (48)
| Princes Park
| 30,000
| 7 June 1930
|- bgcolor="#FFFFFF"
| 
| 11.15 (81)
| 
| 9.12 (66)
| Punt Road Oval
| 16,000
| 9 June 1930
|- bgcolor="#FFFFFF"
| 
| 16.11 (107)
| 
| 9.12 (66)
| Windy Hill
| 20,000
| 9 June 1930
|- bgcolor="#FFFFFF"
| 
| 11.10 (76)
| 
| 10.7 (67)
| Junction Oval
| 29,000
| 9 June 1930

Round 7

|- bgcolor="#CCCCFF"
| Home team
| Home team score
| Away team
| Away team score
| Venue
| Crowd
| Date
|- bgcolor="#FFFFFF"
| 
| 9.15 (69)
| 
| 10.10 (70)
| Corio Oval
| 9,500
| 14 June 1930
|- bgcolor="#FFFFFF"
| 
| 7.14 (56)
| 
| 10.12 (72)
| Western Oval
| 15,000
| 14 June 1930
|- bgcolor="#FFFFFF"
| 
| 17.11 (113)
| 
| 9.10 (64)
| Lake Oval
| 11,000
| 14 June 1930
|- bgcolor="#FFFFFF"
| 
| 13.13 (91)
| 
| 16.10 (106)
| Brunswick Street Oval
| 15,000
| 14 June 1930
|- bgcolor="#FFFFFF"
| 
| 11.13 (79)
| 
| 14.13 (97)
| MCG
| 28,779
| 14 June 1930
|- bgcolor="#FFFFFF"
| 
| 9.9 (63)
| 
| 15.23 (113)
| Arden Street Oval
| 15,000
| 14 June 1930

Round 8

|- bgcolor="#CCCCFF"
| Home team
| Home team score
| Away team
| Away team score
| Venue
| Crowd
| Date
|- bgcolor="#FFFFFF"
| 
| 11.11 (77)
| 
| 8.8 (56)
| Windy Hill
| 13,000
| 21 June 1930
|- bgcolor="#FFFFFF"
| 
| 22.11 (143)
| 
| 14.8 (92)
| Victoria Park
| 15,000
| 21 June 1930
|- bgcolor="#FFFFFF"
| 
| 9.16 (70)
| 
| 9.18 (72)
| Princes Park
| 30,000
| 21 June 1930
|- bgcolor="#FFFFFF"
| 
| 9.18 (72)
| 
| 6.11 (47)
| Glenferrie Oval
| 8,000
| 21 June 1930
|- bgcolor="#FFFFFF"
| 
| 15.19 (109)
| 
| 8.12 (60)
| Lake Oval
| 12,000
| 21 June 1930
|- bgcolor="#FFFFFF"
| 
| 14.16 (100)
| 
| 10.12 (72)
| Punt Road Oval
| 14,000
| 21 June 1930

Round 9

|- bgcolor="#CCCCFF"
| Home team
| Home team score
| Away team
| Away team score
| Venue
| Crowd
| Date
|- bgcolor="#FFFFFF"
| 
| 5.13 (43)
| 
| 14.20 (104)
| Arden Street Oval
| 11,000
| 28 June 1930
|- bgcolor="#FFFFFF"
| 
| 14.12 (96)
| 
| 11.6 (72)
| Corio Oval
| 9,000
| 28 June 1930
|- bgcolor="#FFFFFF"
| 
| 18.11 (119)
| 
| 13.17 (95)
| Brunswick Street Oval
| 11,000
| 28 June 1930
|- bgcolor="#FFFFFF"
| 
| 17.12 (114)
| 
| 11.22 (88)
| MCG
| 28,344
| 28 June 1930
|- bgcolor="#FFFFFF"
| 
| 5.14 (44)
| 
| 19.10 (124)
| Western Oval
| 14,000
| 28 June 1930
|- bgcolor="#FFFFFF"
| 
| 12.5 (77)
| 
| 13.14 (92)
| Junction Oval
| 33,000
| 28 June 1930

Round 10

|- bgcolor="#CCCCFF"
| Home team
| Home team score
| Away team
| Away team score
| Venue
| Crowd
| Date
|- bgcolor="#FFFFFF"
| 
| 11.15 (81)
| 
| 11.11 (77)
| Glenferrie Oval
| 7,000
| 5 July 1930
|- bgcolor="#FFFFFF"
| 
| 13.20 (98)
| 
| 9.20 (74)
| Windy Hill
| 16,000
| 5 July 1930
|- bgcolor="#FFFFFF"
| 
| 16.20 (116)
| 
| 16.16 (112)
| Princes Park
| 40,000
| 5 July 1930
|- bgcolor="#FFFFFF"
| 
| 14.20 (104)
| 
| 7.10 (52)
| Punt Road Oval
| 18,000
| 5 July 1930
|- bgcolor="#FFFFFF"
| 
| 15.8 (98)
| 
| 7.16 (58)
| Corio Oval
| 8,000
| 5 July 1930
|- bgcolor="#FFFFFF"
| 
| 13.16 (94)
| 
| 12.12 (84)
| Lake Oval
| 12,000
| 5 July 1930

Round 11

|- bgcolor="#CCCCFF"
| Home team
| Home team score
| Away team
| Away team score
| Venue
| Crowd
| Date
|- bgcolor="#FFFFFF"
| 
| 6.9 (45)
| 
| 10.20 (80)
| Arden Street Oval
| 7,000
| 12 July 1930
|- bgcolor="#FFFFFF"
| 
| 8.14 (62)
| 
| 10.15 (75)
| Brunswick Street Oval
| 8,000
| 12 July 1930
|- bgcolor="#FFFFFF"
| 
| 14.14 (98)
| 
| 9.14 (68)
| Victoria Park
| 16,000
| 12 July 1930
|- bgcolor="#FFFFFF"
| 
| 5.6 (36)
| 
| 7.18 (60)
| Junction Oval
| 19,000
| 12 July 1930
|- bgcolor="#FFFFFF"
| 
| 12.10 (82)
| 
| 6.5 (41)
| MCG
| 8,723
| 12 July 1930
|- bgcolor="#FFFFFF"
| 
| 8.3 (51)
| 
| 12.14 (86)
| Western Oval
| 12,000
| 12 July 1930

Round 12

|- bgcolor="#CCCCFF"
| Home team
| Home team score
| Away team
| Away team score
| Venue
| Crowd
| Date
|- bgcolor="#FFFFFF"
| 
| 8.10 (58)
| 
| 7.19 (61)
| Western Oval
| 12,000
| 19 July 1930
|- bgcolor="#FFFFFF"
| 
| 15.16 (106)
| 
| 16.12 (108)
| Windy Hill
| 14,000
| 19 July 1930
|- bgcolor="#FFFFFF"
| 
| 25.17 (167)
| 
| 13.16 (94)
| Victoria Park
| 14,000
| 19 July 1930
|- bgcolor="#FFFFFF"
| 
| 15.16 (106)
| 
| 13.13 (91)
| Princes Park
| 23,000
| 19 July 1930
|- bgcolor="#FFFFFF"
| 
| 18.15 (123)
| 
| 7.6 (48)
| Junction Oval
| 10,000
| 19 July 1930
|- bgcolor="#FFFFFF"
| 
| 15.19 (109)
| 
| 7.7 (49)
| Punt Road Oval
| 10,000
| 19 July 1930

Round 13

|- bgcolor="#CCCCFF"
| Home team
| Home team score
| Away team
| Away team score
| Venue
| Crowd
| Date
|- bgcolor="#FFFFFF"
| 
| 12.10 (82)
| 
| 9.11 (65)
| MCG
| 20,232
| 26 July 1930
|- bgcolor="#FFFFFF"
| 
| 11.11 (77)
| 
| 10.11 (71)
| Lake Oval
| 22,000
| 26 July 1930
|- bgcolor="#FFFFFF"
| 
| 11.10 (76)
| 
| 11.7 (73)
| Glenferrie Oval
| 9,000
| 26 July 1930
|- bgcolor="#FFFFFF"
| 
| 13.14 (92)
| 
| 9.9 (63)
| Corio Oval
| 10,000
| 26 July 1930
|- bgcolor="#FFFFFF"
| 
| 4.15 (39)
| 
| 18.13 (121)
| Arden Street Oval
| 8,000
| 26 July 1930
|- bgcolor="#FFFFFF"
| 
| 10.9 (69)
| 
| 10.16 (76)
| Brunswick Street Oval
| 19,000
| 26 July 1930

Round 14

|- bgcolor="#CCCCFF"
| Home team
| Home team score
| Away team
| Away team score
| Venue
| Crowd
| Date
|- bgcolor="#FFFFFF"
| 
| 11.7 (73)
| 
| 14.10 (94)
| Glenferrie Oval
| 10,000
| 16 August 1930
|- bgcolor="#FFFFFF"
| 
| 12.19 (91)
| 
| 10.11 (71)
| Windy Hill
| 9,000
| 16 August 1930
|- bgcolor="#FFFFFF"
| 
| 15.14 (104)
| 
| 8.9 (57)
| Victoria Park
| 15,000
| 16 August 1930
|- bgcolor="#FFFFFF"
| 
| 23.17 (155)
| 
| 3.9 (27)
| Princes Park
| 11,000
| 16 August 1930
|- bgcolor="#FFFFFF"
| 
| 9.11 (65)
| 
| 10.11 (71)
| Punt Road Oval
| 15,000
| 16 August 1930
|- bgcolor="#FFFFFF"
| 
| 9.7 (61)
| 
| 7.10 (52)
| Junction Oval
| 10,000
| 16 August 1930

Round 15

|- bgcolor="#CCCCFF"
| Home team
| Home team score
| Away team
| Away team score
| Venue
| Crowd
| Date
|- bgcolor="#FFFFFF"
| 
| 18.17 (125)
| 
| 6.7 (43)
| Corio Oval
| 9,000
| 23 August 1930
|- bgcolor="#FFFFFF"
| 
| 8.18 (66)
| 
| 11.18 (84)
| Western Oval
| 12,500
| 23 August 1930
|- bgcolor="#FFFFFF"
| 
| 11.5 (71)
| 
| 8.12 (60)
| Brunswick Street Oval
| 14,000
| 23 August 1930
|- bgcolor="#FFFFFF"
| 
| 6.12 (48)
| 
| 14.11 (95)
| Arden Street Oval
| 8,000
| 23 August 1930
|- bgcolor="#FFFFFF"
| 
| 14.7 (91)
| 
| 17.13 (115)
| Junction Oval
| 16,000
| 23 August 1930
|- bgcolor="#FFFFFF"
| 
| 12.11 (83)
| 
| 11.11 (77)
| MCG
| 31,481
| 23 August 1930

Round 16

|- bgcolor="#CCCCFF"
| Home team
| Home team score
| Away team
| Away team score
| Venue
| Crowd
| Date
|- bgcolor="#FFFFFF"
| 
| 13.11 (89)
| 
| 12.7 (79)
| Windy Hill
| 15,000
| 30 August 1930
|- bgcolor="#FFFFFF"
| 
| 16.20 (116)
| 
| 10.17 (77)
| Victoria Park
| 10,000
| 30 August 1930
|- bgcolor="#FFFFFF"
| 
| 16.12 (108)
| 
| 15.7 (97)
| Princes Park
| 20,000
| 30 August 1930
|- bgcolor="#FFFFFF"
| 
| 20.15 (135)
| 
| 5.10 (40)
| Punt Road Oval
| 7,000
| 30 August 1930
|- bgcolor="#FFFFFF"
| 
| 12.16 (88)
| 
| 15.14 (104)
| Lake Oval
| 28,000
| 30 August 1930
|- bgcolor="#FFFFFF"
| 
| 3.16 (34)
| 
| 15.14 (104)
| Glenferrie Oval
| 7,000
| 30 August 1930

Round 17

|- bgcolor="#CCCCFF"
| Home team
| Home team score
| Away team
| Away team score
| Venue
| Crowd
| Date
|- bgcolor="#FFFFFF"
| 
| 8.14 (62)
| 
| 12.14 (86)
| MCG
| 25,353
| 6 September 1930
|- bgcolor="#FFFFFF"
| 
| 15.8 (98)
| 
| 11.15 (81)
| Western Oval
| 8,500
| 6 September 1930
|- bgcolor="#FFFFFF"
| 
| 15.19 (109)
| 
| 14.8 (92)
| Brunswick Street Oval
| 8,000
| 6 September 1930
|- bgcolor="#FFFFFF"
| 
| 7.9 (51)
| 
| 9.12 (66)
| Arden Street Oval
| 4,000
| 6 September 1930
|- bgcolor="#FFFFFF"
| 
| 12.18 (90)
| 
| 7.11 (53)
| Junction Oval
| 13,000
| 6 September 1930
|- bgcolor="#FFFFFF"
| 
| 16.10 (106)
| 
| 12.11 (83)
| Victoria Park
| 30,000
| 6 September 1930

Round 18

|- bgcolor="#CCCCFF"
| Home team
| Home team score
| Away team
| Away team score
| Venue
| Crowd
| Date
|- bgcolor="#FFFFFF"
| 
| 7.11 (53)
| 
| 8.15 (63)
| Punt Road Oval
| 17,000
| 13 September 1930
|- bgcolor="#FFFFFF"
| 
| 12.18 (90)
| 
| 10.17 (77)
| Glenferrie Oval
| 5,000
| 13 September 1930
|- bgcolor="#FFFFFF"
| 
| 10.22 (82)
| 
| 3.8 (26)
| Princes Park
| 15,000
| 13 September 1930
|- bgcolor="#FFFFFF"
| 
| 15.19 (109)
| 
| 5.6 (36)
| Lake Oval
| 5,000
| 13 September 1930
|- bgcolor="#FFFFFF"
| 
| 10.18 (78)
| 
| 4.14 (38)
| Corio Oval
| 5,000
| 13 September 1930
|- bgcolor="#FFFFFF"
| 
| 10.6 (66)
| 
| 17.7 (109)
| Windy Hill
| 14,000
| 13 September 1930

Ladder

Finals

All of the 1930 finals were played at the MCG so the home team in the semi-finals and preliminary final is purely the higher ranked team from the ladder but in the Grand Final the home team was the team that won the preliminary final.

Semi-finals

|- bgcolor="#CCCCFF"
| Home team
| Score
| Away team
| Score
| Venue
| Crowd
| Date
|- bgcolor="#FFFFFF"
| 
| 8.21 (69)
| 
| 13.11 (89)
| MCG
| 47,985
| 20 September
|- bgcolor="#FFFFFF"
| Collingwood
| 14.10 (94)
| 
| 14.7 (91)
| MCG
| 40,218
| 27 September

Preliminary final

|- bgcolor="#CCCCFF"
| Home team
| Score
| Away team
| Score
| Venue
| Crowd
| Date
|- bgcolor="#FFFFFF"
| Collingwood
| 9.11 (65)
| 
| 12.19 (91)
| MCG
| 41,495
| 4 October

Grand final

Collingwood defeated Geelong 14.16 (100) to 9.16 (70), in front of a crowd of 45,022 people. (For an explanation of scoring see Australian rules football).

Awards
 The 1930 VFL Premiership team was Collingwood.
 The VFL's leading goalkicker was Gordon Coventry of Collingwood with 118 goals.
 The winner of the 1930 Brownlow Medal was Stan Judkins of Richmond with 4 votes.
 North Melbourne took the "wooden spoon" in 1930.
Geelong 14.12 (96) defeated  11.8 (74) in the final, played as a curtain-raiser to the firsts preliminary final on 4 October.

Brownlow Medal
When the VFL's Umpires Panel counted the Brownlow Medal votes that had been awarded during the 1930 season, it found that three players had been considered best on the ground on four occasions: Harry Collier of Collingwood, Allan Hopkins of Footscray, and Stan Judkins of Richmond. Upon reviewing the rules, there were two inconsistent provisions in the rules concerning Brownlow ties: one in which the umpires would meet to determine the winner, and another in which the player who earned his votes from the fewest game would break the tie; there were also three informal votes which could not be counted, one of which is understood to have ambiguously been for 'Collier', not distinguishing between Harry and brother Albert. The panel recommended that no Brownlow Medal be awarded for 1930; but the full league board of management instead decided used the 'fewest games' tiebreaker to award the medal Judkins, who had played 12 games compared with Hopkins' 15 and Collier's 18.

In 1981, the league changed Brownlow Medal rules to allow more than one player to receive the medal if tied on votes; and, in 1989, it retrospectively awarded medals to Harry Collier and Allan Hopkins for 1930. All three are now considered joint winners.

Notable events
 Harrison House at 31 Spring Street, Melbourne (at the corner of Spring Street and Flinders Lane), was officially opened as VFL headquarters.
 The Australian National Football Council introduced a substitute player, known as the 19th man. This meant that teams now had 18 "run on" players, and one "reserve" player. The 19th man could be substituted for an injured player, or for any other player for tactical reasons. Once he had been substituted, a player could not return to the field of play under any circumstances. The 19th man was paid a match fee only if he took the field. 
 Collingwood won its fourth consecutive premiership; in four seasons, 1927, 1928, 1929, and 1930 Collingwood had played 82 matches, for 70 wins, 1 draw, and 11 losses. It is still the record number of consecutive premierships to this day.
 In March, the VFL accepts the Player Payments Committee recommendation that, although they may well be paid less, no senior players can be paid more than £3 for each home-and-away match (players were also to be paid if they were injured), and no more than £12 for a finals match (approx. $170 and $680 respectively in 2008 buying power); and that no additional lump-sum payments could be made. The VFL also institutes a series of penalties for breaches (fines, suspension of players and deduction of premiership points) of what rapidly became known as the "Coulter Law" (after Gordon Coulter, the Player Payment Committee's chairman).
 In round 12, Gordon Coventry kicked a record 17 goals. The same match broke the record for the highest aggregate score in league history at that time, with the two teams scoring a combined 38.33 (261).

References  

 Hogan, P., The Tigers of Old, The Richmond Football Club, (Richmond), 1996. 
 Maplestone, M., Flying Higher: History of the Essendon Football Club 1872–1996, Essendon Football Club, (Melbourne), 1996. 
 Rogers, S. & Brown, A., Every Game Ever Played: VFL/AFL Results 1897–1997 (Sixth Edition), Viking Books, (Ringwood), 1998. 
 Ross, J. (ed), 100 Years of Australian Football 1897–1996: The Complete Story of the AFL, All the Big Stories, All the Great Pictures, All the Champions, Every AFL Season Reported, Viking, (Ringwood), 1996.

External links
 1930 Season - AFL Tables

Australian Football League seasons
Vfl season